WASG may refer to:
 WASG (AM), a radio station (540 AM) licensed to Atmore, Alabama, United States
 Western Australian Speleology Group located in Western Australia, Australia
 Wide area synchronous grid
 Labour and Social Justice – The Electoral Alternative, known as WASG in German